Panthers Over Korea (2007) is a non-fiction account of George Schnitzer's (1929–2010) experiences as a United States Navy pilot during the Korean War flying the Grumman F9F Panther Jet aircraft.

What we did as part of the war was soon forgotten by the nation in general and the war earned the title: The Forgotten War.  To those of us who went through the hail of enemy AAA fire, it was never forgotten.  Eight of us started out on this adventure; six of us came home alive after flying an average of 150 missions.

Plot summary
Carrier Air Group 15 soon will meet the North Korean communist military. The grind of combat flying becomes quickly apparent as they attack North Korean supply lines. The North Korean gunners try to destroy the U.S. Navy Ground-attack aircraft with Anti-aircraft warfare installations. For the U.S. pilots it is not only the North Korean bullets that they face, but also the difficulty of operating jets off the World War II aircraft carrier. The flights alternate between boring and suddenly frightening as the deadly North Korean Tracer ammunition bullets chase them.

The F9F Jet Fighter
The Grumman F9F Panther was the manufacturer's first jet fighter and the U.S. Navy's second. The Panther was the most widely used U.S. Navy jet fighter of the Korean War. It flew 78,000 sorties and was responsible for the first air kill by the US Navy in the war—the downing of a North Korean Yakovlev Yak-9 fighter.

The Panther played a prominent role in the 1954 movie Men of the Fighting Lady (also known as Panther Squadron). The F9F was featured in the flying sequences in the 1955 movie The Bridges at Toko-Ri, although in the 1953 James A. Michener novel upon which the movie was based, the main character flew an F2H Banshee.

The Korean War

After failing to strengthen their cause in the free elections held in South Korea during May 1950 and the refusal of South Korea to hold new elections per North Korean demands, the communist North Korean Army assaulted the South on June 25, 1950. The conflict was then expanded by the United States and the Soviet Union's involvement as part of the larger Cold War.

The Korean War was the first armed confrontation of the Cold War and set the standard for many later conflicts. It created the idea of a limited war, where the two superpowers would fight in another country, forcing the people in that nation to suffer the bulk of the destruction and death involved in a war between such large nations.

Notes
This George Schnitzer is related to the George Schnitzer who died during the  crash.  CPO George Conrad Schnitzer, Radio Officer USS Shenandoah ZR-1.

Further reading
Grossnick, Roy and Armstrong William J. United States Naval Aviation, 1910–1995. Annapolis, Maryland: Naval Historical Center, 1997. .
Meyer, Corwin H. "Grumman Panther". Flight Journal, Oct. 2002.
Schnitzer, George. Panthers Over Korea. Baltimore, Maryland: Publish America, 2007. .
Sullivan, Jim. F9F Panther/Cougar in action. Carrollton, Texas: Squadron/Signal Publications, 1982. .
Taylor, John W.R. "Grumman F9F Cougar". Combat Aircraft of the World from 1909 to the present. New York: G.P. Putnam's Sons, 1969. .
Winchester, Jim, ed. "Grumman F9F Panther". 'Military Aircraft of the Cold War (The Aviation Factfile). London: Grange Books plc, 2006. .

Korean War books
20th-century military history of the United States